Panguna is a town and a (now decommissioned) copper mine on Bougainville Island, Papua New Guinea. It was owned and operated by Bougainville Copper Ltd, a subsidiary of Rio Tinto. Beginning operations in 1972, the company hired thousands of workers, most from other parts of the country. 

By the end of its operations on May 15, 1989, when the mine was closed because of an armed uprising on the island, it was the largest open-pit mine in the world. It was accused of contaminating large areas due to its toxic waste, which affected land, water and air. Resentment against the environmental poisoning and the fact that most profits left the island, were major catalysts in the unrest in Bougainville in the 1970s and 1980s, leading to the Bougainville conflict, which lasted from 1988 until 1998. In 2011 it was reported that former PNG Prime Minister Sir Michael Somare had alleged that Rio Tinto played a role in the conflict by helping finance the actions of the PNG government in Bougainville during the conflict in an attempt to allow the mine to be reopened.

See also 
 History of Bougainville
 Bougainville Copper Ltd
 Bougainville Revolutionary Army

References

External links 
 Google Maps link to the Panguna open cut mine

Populated places in the Autonomous Region of Bougainville
Surface mines in Papua New Guinea
Mining communities in Oceania
Copper mines in Papua New Guinea